Fake (Thai: เฟค โกหกทั้งเพ) is a 2003 Thai romantic drama film directed by Thanakorn Pongsuwan. It starred Leo Putt (Putthipong Sriwat), Ray MacDonald, Tah Barby (Phaopol Thephatsadin na Ayutthaya) and Pachrapa Chaichua.  The debut feature by Thanakorn, it was screened at the Vancouver International Film Festival, the Stockholm International Film Festival and the Singapore International Film Festival in 2003 and 2004.

Plot
Three young hipster men who share an apartment in Bangkok are each chasing after a woman, but are unaware that it's the same woman they are after.

Cast
Leo Putt (Putthipong Sriwat) as Poh
Ray MacDonald as Sung
Tah Barby (Phaopol Thephatsadin na Ayutthaya) as Bay
Pachrapa Chaichua as Paweena

External links
 

2003 films
Sahamongkol Film International films
Thai-language films
2003 romantic drama films
Thai romantic drama films